Barbara Grocholska (born 24 August 1927) is a Polish alpine skier. She competed at the 1952 Winter Olympics and the 1956 Winter Olympics.

References

1927 births
Living people
Polish female alpine skiers
Olympic alpine skiers of Poland
Alpine skiers at the 1952 Winter Olympics
Alpine skiers at the 1956 Winter Olympics
Sportspeople from Warsaw
20th-century Polish women